The Indianapolis Airport Authority Police Department was founded in 1971. Its primary responsibilities are general law enforcement duties, as well as to ensure the safety and security of the Indianapolis International Airport and its five associated reliever airports: Indianapolis Regional Airport, Indianapolis Metropolitan Airport, Eagle Creek Airpark, Hendricks County Airport, and the Indianapolis Downtown Heliport.

The agency enforces state and local laws on all areas that fall under the jurisdiction of the Indianapolis Airport Authority, which includes areas in Marion, Hamilton, Hendricks, Hancock and Morgan counties.

External links
 http://business.ind.com/services_amenities/apd.aspx

Airport police departments of the United States
Government of Indianapolis
Organizations established in 1971
1971 establishments in Indiana